The 1989 firebombing of the Riverdale Press was an attack in which two firebombs were thrown at the offices of a weekly newspaper, the Riverdale Press,  in the Riverdale community of the Bronx, New York City on February 28, 1989. The building was heavily damaged. Two California bookstores were also damaged in similar attacks.

The bombing took place shortly after the newspaper published an editorial defending Salman Rushdie during the controversy over The Satanic Verses.

See also

 The Satanic Verses controversy

References

Terrorist incidents in the United States in 1989
1989 in New York City
Building bombings in the United States
Crimes in the Bronx
Salman Rushdie
History of the Bronx
Attacks on buildings and structures in the United States
1980s in the Bronx
Attacks on buildings and structures in 1999